Benjamin Thau (15 December 1898 – 5 July 1983) was an American businessman who became vice-president of the Hollywood film studio Metro-Goldwyn-Mayer (MGM), a subsidiary of the Loew's theater chain. From 1928 he was in charge of casting, in the business of discovering and developing talented performers. He was known for his quiet and calming influence with often temperamental stars. Towards the end of his career he was head of the studio from 1956 to 1958.

Casting director
Born to a Jewish family, Thau started his career as a vaudeville booking agent for Keith's and the Orpheum Circuit.

In 1927 he joined Loews as a head booker for their theatres. In 1932 he joined MGM as a casting director. He worked closely with Louis B. Mayer and Irving Thalberg and eventually became Mayer's assistant.

Thau had a pleasant nature and was regarded with affection by many of the workers at MGM, but wielded considerable power.
Thau belonged to Mayer's executive team, called "the college of cardinals", along with Eddie Mannix, Lawrence Weingarten and Hunt Stromberg.
Thau managed the pool of talent, called by the publicity department "more stars than there are in heaven."

In 1938 Thau, along with other executives, agreed to produce a film version of  Erich Maria Remarque's classic novel Three Comrades, but watered down the script to avoid anything that could offend Germany's Nazi government.

George Sidney described Thau as "a very quiet man, a gentle man." He would be brought in to calm down the performers when they got upset. He said, "Benny spoke very quietly. You could almost never quite hear what he said. But he would talk to this one and that one and had the ability to calm things down.
A Vanity Fair article by Bob Colacello described Thau in 1949 as  a "short, heavyset man with thinning hair", and quoted the biographer Charles Higham as saying "Thau's casting couch was the busiest in Hollywood".

Relationships with the stars

Benny Thau was trusted by the stars. For example, Greta Garbo never had a formal contract with MGM. The director and producer Gottfried Reinhardt recalled that at one time Thau explained to Garbo that if she accepted a sizable salary reduction she would move into a lower tax bracket and receive the same net pay. She understood the logic and agreed to the cut on a handshake.
When MGM first approached Rosalind Russell for a screen test in the early 1930s she was not enthusiastic, remembering poor treatment at her audition for Universal. When she met MGM's Benny Thau and Ben Piazza she was surprised, as they were "the soul of understanding."

During her first years at MGM Greer Garson was Thau's mistress.
Thau was a strong supporter of Garson, who received an Oscar nomination in 1941 for Blossoms in the Dust.
Joan Crawford, a more established star, was angry that she had not received any recognition, and blamed Thau.
She left the studio. However, in 1953 she was surprised to get a call from Thau offering her a starring role in Torch Song (1953).

Elizabeth Taylor was given a role by MGM in Lassie Come Home, and was offered a long-term contract at the beginning of 1943.
She chose MGM because "the people there had been nicer to her when she went to audition", Taylor recalled.
Benny Thau was to remain the "only MGM executive" she fully trusted during subsequent years, because, according to Alexander Walker, "he had, out of kindly habit, made the gesture that showed her she was loved".
He played a key role in Taylor's career, managing her contracts and helping her get what she wanted on each of her films.
She said she saw Thau as her surrogate father, and went to him "for help and advice".
Thau remembered her as a "little dark-haired beauty ... [with] those strange and lovely eyes that gave the face its central focus, oddly powerful in someone so young."

Thau said of Nancy Davis, the future wife of Ronald Reagan, "I always recommended Nancy for parts. She was sweet and appealing – one of the most popular girls on the lot.
Thau escorted Nancy Davis, to many events in Hollywood. This caused gossip about the relationship between the two.
Kitty Kelley described Thau as "Nancy Davis's boyfriend", saying he paved the way for her Hollywood career, in her 1991 Nancy Reagan: The Unauthorized Biography.

Studio head
In November 1956, MGM president Joseph Vogel sacked Dore Schary as head of production, a job Schary had held since 1951, also being vice-president since 1948. Vogel said he intended not to have a production head - he wanted a "businessman" like Ben Thau or Eddie Mannix. In December 1956, Thau was appointed as chief of executive staff.  Vogel called Thau "one of the best known executives in the motion picture industry  and perhaps one of the least known to the public - quiet and unassuming his name rarely appears in public." The appointment was commonly interpreted as a short term one.

In January 1957, Thau bought the screenrights to Some Come Running.

In May 1957, Vogel appointed Sidney Franklin to work as Thau's associate. Also in May 1957, shooting began on Jailhouse Rock, Elvis Presley's third film and his first  for MGM. As the producer Pandro S. Berman was busy on The Brothers Karamazov, he let Thau, then head of the studio, and Abe Lastfogel, president of the William Morris Agency, decide the cast.

In 1957 MGM's management faced several take-over attempts led by Joseph Tomlinson, with Louis B. Mayer backing them. In October 1957 these attempts were defeated, and Mayer died at the end of the month.

Thau took charge of MGM at a point when the studio was in decline and inherited poorly-conceived projects from Schary. Of the twenty films produced in house in 1956–57, all but one lost money, but Thau turned a loss of almost $500,000 in 1957 into a profit of $5 million the next year. By January 1958, the studio’s financial position had stabilised.

In April 1958, Thau was replaced as studio boss by Sol C. Siegel, who was appointed as head of studio operations for three years. Siegel also became vice-president in charge of production a month later. Vogel had wanted to hire Siegel at the outset, but they had not come to terms.

Later career
After the appointment of Siegel as head of studio, Thau stayed on at MGM as studio administrator, while in June 1958 his assistant Franklin left the studio and was reported to be quitting in a rift. In 1959, Thau was head of contracts.

Benny Thau died in the Motion Picture Home, Los Angeles, in July 1983, after a crippling heart attack.

MGM Films Greenlit Under Thau
The Brothers Karamazov
Some Came Running
Gigi
Jailhouse Rock
Merry Andrews
The Wreck of Mary Dear
Imitation General
The Tunnel of Love
Ben Hur
Tom Thumb

References
Citations

Sources

External links
 

1898 births
1983 deaths
American Jews
Metro-Goldwyn-Mayer executives
American casting directors
Hollywood talent agents